Pacific Tankers, Inc. of San Francisco, California was founded in 1943 as a division of Joshua Hendy Corporation to operate Fleet Oilers for the United States Navy to support World War II efforts. Pacific Tankers, Inc. operated Mission Buenaventura-class oiler, a Type T2 tanker (Type T2-SE-A2). Each Pacific Tankers, Inc. tanker has a merchant crew of about 9 officers and 39 men. Pacific Tankers Inc. was a major tanker operator for the war with a fleet of over 60 tankers. Pacific Tankers, Inc. continued operations after the war. 

Joshua Hendy Corporation was founded in the 1850s as an engineering and mining company. Joshua Hendy Corporation engineering was used in the construction of the Panama Canal form 1904 to 1914.  In for World War II Joshua Hendy Corporation built twelve triple expansion marine steam engines for  Liberty ship.  

The Federal Bureau of Investigation did an investigation into the sales of a Pacific Tankers, Inc ship to Aristotle Onassis in 1951-1952.

Pacific Tankers, Inc. ships

Some of Pacific Tankers Inc ships:
SS Mckittrick built in 1944  (owned 1947–1951)
SS Montebello Hills built in 1944  (owned 1948–1951)
SS William M. Burden (SS Brookfield)  built in 1944 (owned 1950–1951)
SS Pecos (1944– )
USS Sebec (AO-87) leased 1946 to 1950.
SS Saugatuck   (owned 1947–1948)

World War II ships

Some of the US government-owned, Naval Transportation Service tankers,operated by commercial firm Pacific Tankers, Inc: 
SS Mission Santa Ynez T2
SS Mission Soledad
SS Mission San Fernando
SS Mission San Jose
SS Mission San Gabriel
SS Redstone
SS Mission San Miguel
SS Mission Carmel
SS San Luis Obispo
 SS Mission Capistrano
 SS  Santa Barbara
 SS Mission Santa Clara
 SS Mission Santa Ana 
 SS Mission Dolores
 SS Mission San Carlos
 SS Mission San Luis Rey
 SS Chalmette, (later Lynchburg (T-AO-l54))
 SS Umatilla

See also
World War II United States Merchant Navy

References

External links
 The T2 Tanker page
 T-tanker list

American companies established in 1943
History of the San Francisco Bay Area
Transport companies established in 1943
Defunct shipping companies of the United States